The College of Natural and Agricultural Sciences (CNAS) at the University of California, Riverside, is a nationally unique academic division in that it combines the physical, biological, mathematical and agricultural disciplines under one organizational umbrella. The college is organized into 13 academic departments: Biochemistry, Biology, Botany and Plant Sciences, Cell Biology and Neuroscience, Chemistry, Earth Sciences, Entomology, Environmental Sciences, Mathematics, Nematology, Physics, Plant Pathology and Microbiology, and Statistics.

The college dates back to 1907, when the UC Citrus Experiment Station was founded at the base of Riverside's Mt. Rubidoux. In 1958, the College of Agriculture was formed as the first research-oriented, graduate degree-granting institution at UCR. Steady growth and a series of mergers led to the 1974 formation of the present College of Natural and Agricultural Sciences.

See also
 List of University of California, Riverside people

References

College of Natural and Agricultural Sciences
Agriculture in Riverside County, California